

The Antonov A-2 and related designs were a family of two-seat training gliders produced in the Soviet Union in the 1930s and 1940s, all derived from the single-seat Antonov A-1 family. They were produced in large numbers, with at least 2,300 built by 1937, and together with the single-seaters, production exceeded 7,600 by the same year.

Like the A-1, the A-2 was a minimalist primary glider, with a conventional tail mounted on a boom and a strut-braced monoplane wing, mounted parasol-fashion. However, while the single-seat primary gliders featured wings of constant chord, the two-seaters used the longer-span, tapered wings that had been developed for the soaring versions of the single-seat family (P-s1 and P-s2). The other major difference was the design of the cockpit gondola. The single-seaters featured an aerodynamic fairing that slid on and off to provide access to the pilot's seat. The two-seaters, however, had a permanently fixed cockpit pod that seated the pilot and instructor in tandem, open cockpits, each with a small windscreen The rear cockpit was located directly beneath the wing and was accessed via a door on the port side of the gondola. Apart from the change in gondola, all other components remained interchangeable with the Ps-2

Variants
In each case, the "s" stands for serii (серии – "series")

Uchebnyi (Учебный – "Trainer")
 U-s5 (У-с5)
 U-s6 (У-с6)

Specifications (U-s5)

Notes

References
 
 
 

1930s Soviet sailplanes
Glider aircraft
A-02
Aircraft first flown in 1936